Anton Kui is a professional rugby league footballer who plays for the Bingtangor Lahanis in Papua New Guinea. He is a Papua New Guinea international.

Career
Kui was named in the Papua New Guinea training squad, and later in the main squad for the 2008 Rugby League World Cup. He was named as part of the Papua New Guinea squad for the 2009 Pacific Cup.

References

External links

Living people
Goroka Lahanis players
Mendi Muruks players
Papua New Guinea national rugby league team players
Papua New Guinean rugby league players
Papua New Guinean sportsmen
Rugby league centres
Windsor Wolves players
Year of birth missing (living people)